Vadra is an Indian (Khatri) surname. Notable people with the surname include:
Priyanka Gandhi, also known as Priyanka Gandhi Vadra (born 1972), Indian politician
Robert Vadra (born 1969), Indian businessman, husband of Priyanka

Indian surnames
Punjabi-language surnames
Surnames of Indian origin
Hindu surnames
Khatri clans
Khatri surnames